Joseph Bermingham (9 May 1919 – 11 August 1995) was an Irish Labour Party politician.

Bermingham was born in Castlemitchell, County Kildare. He was educated at the Christian Brothers school in Athy and the O'Brien Institute in Dublin. Bermingham worked as a shopkeeper before being elected in 1967 as a member of Kildare County Council. He was an unsuccessful candidate for Dáil Éireann at the 1969 general election and at a by-election in 1970. He was elected to the 20th Dáil as Labour Party Teachta Dála (TD) for the Kildare constituency at the 1973 general election.

After the 1981 general election, Labour and Fine Gael formed a coalition government. Bermingham was appointed by the government to the position of Minister of State at the Department of Finance with responsibility for the Office of Public Works. He served in that post until early 1982 when the government of Garret FitzGerald fell in a vote on the budget. When a new Fine Gael–Labour Party coalition came to power after the November 1982 general election Bermingham returned to same position. He lost that position as part of a reshuffle in February 1986.

Bermingham resigned from the Labour Party in June 1986, which left the government parties in a minority in the Dáil. He did not contest the 1987 general election. He remained active in local politics and was elected to Kildare County Council in 1991 as an independent.

References

 

1919 births
1995 deaths
Labour Party (Ireland) TDs
Local councillors in County Kildare
Members of the 20th Dáil
Members of the 21st Dáil
Members of the 22nd Dáil
Members of the 23rd Dáil
Members of the 24th Dáil
Ministers of State of the 24th Dáil
Ministers of State of the 22nd Dáil
Politicians from County Kildare